The  Omaha-class cruisers were a class of light cruisers built for the United States Navy. They were the oldest class of cruiser still in active service with the Navy at the outbreak of World War II, being an immediate post-World War I design.

History

Maneuvers conducted in January 1915 made it clear that the US Atlantic Fleet lacked the fast cruisers necessary to provide information on the enemy's position, deny the enemy information of the fleet's own position, and screen friendly forces. Built to scout for a fleet of battleships, the Omaha class featured high speed for cooperation with destroyers, and  guns to fend off any destroyers the enemy might send against them.

Although from a modern viewpoint, a conflict between the US and Great Britain seems implausible, US Navy planners during this time, and up to the mid-1930s, considered Britain to be a formidable rival for power in the Atlantic, and the possibility of armed conflict between the two countries plausible enough to merit appropriate planning measures.

The Omaha class mounted four smokestacks, a look remarkably similar to the s (a camouflage scheme was devised to enhance the resemblance). Their armament showed the slow change from casemate-mounted weapons to turret-mounted guns. They carried twelve /53 caliber guns, of which four were mounted in two twin turrets, one fore and one aft, and the remaining eight in casemates; four on each side, at the corners of the superstructure. This gave them a broadside of eight guns. Launched in 1920,  (designated C-4 and later CL-4) had a displacement of 7,050 long tons. The cruisers emerged with a distinctly old-fashioned appearance owing to their World War I-type stacked twin casemate-mount cannons and were among the last broadside cruisers designed anywhere.

Additional torpedo tubes and hydrophone installation was ordered. As a result of the design changes placed on the ship mid-construction, the vessel that entered the water in 1920, was a badly overloaded design that, even at the beginning, had been rather tight. The ships were insufficiently insulated, too hot in the tropics and too cold in the north. Sacrifices in weight savings in the name of increased speed led to severe compromise in the habitability of the ship. While described as a good ship in a seaway, the low freeboard led to frequent water ingestion over the bow and in the torpedo compartments and lower aft casemates. The lightly built hulls leaked, so that sustained high-speed steaming contaminated the oil tanks with sea water.

A serious flaw in these ships' subdivision was the complete lack of watertight bulkheads anywhere above the main deck or aft on the main deck.

These drawbacks notwithstanding, the US Navy took some pride in the Omaha class. They featured improved compartmentalization; propulsion machinery was laid out on the unit system, with alternating groups of boiler rooms and engine rooms, to prevent immobilization by a single torpedo hit. Magazines were the first to be placed on centerline, below the waterline. These were also the first U.S. Navy cruisers designed after the switch from coal to oil-fired boilers.

Originally designed to serve as scouts, they served throughout the interwar period as leaders of fleet flotillas, helping them resist enemy destroyer attack. Tactical scouting became the province of cruiser aircraft, and the distant scouting role was taken over by the new heavy cruisers spawned by the Washington Naval Treaty. Thus, the Omaha class never performed their designed function. They were relegated to the fleet-screening role, where their high speed and great volume of fire were most appreciated.

Armament changes
During their careers the Omahas went through several armament changes. Some of these changes were to save weight, while others were to increase their AA armament. On 8 September 1926, the Chief of Naval Operations, Admiral Edward W. Eberle, along with the Commanders in Chief of the United States Fleet and Battle Fleet, and their subordinate commanding officers, the Secretary of the Navy, Curtis D. Wilbur, ordered that all mines and the tracks for laying the mines be removed from all of the Omaha-class cruisers, as the working conditions had been found to be very "wet". In 1933–1934, their 3-inch AA guns were increased from two to eight, all mounted in the ship's waist. The lower torpedo tube mounts, which had also proved to be very wet, were removed and the openings plated over before the start of World War II. After 1939, the lower aft 6-inch guns were removed from most of the Omahas and the casemates plated over for the same reason as the lower torpedo mounts. The ships' AA armament was first augmented by three quadruple /75 gun mounts by early 1942, however, these did not prove reliable and were replaced by twin  Bofors guns later in the war. At about the same time they also received  Oerlikon cannons.

World War II service

The ships of the Omaha class spent most of the war deployed to secondary theaters and in less vital tasks than those assigned to more recently built cruisers. The Omaha class were sent to places where their significant armament might be useful if called upon, but where their age and limited abilities were less likely to be tested. These secondary destinations included patrols off the east and west coasts of South America, convoy escort in the South Pacific far from the front lines of battle, patrols and shore bombardment along the distant and frigid Aleutians and Kuril Islands chains, and bombardment duty in the invasion of Southern France when naval resistance was expected to be minimal. The most significant action that any of the ships of the class saw during the war was s participation in early war actions around the Dutch East Indies (most notably, the Battle of Makassar Strait), and s engagement in the Battle of the Komandorski Islands.

None of the ships were wartime losses. Raleighs torpedo damage at Pearl Harbor and Marbleheads damage at Makassar Strait were the only significant wartime combat damage suffered by the class.

Ships in class
The following ships of the class were constructed.

Omaha alternatives
Two other Omaha versions were also designed. The first, intended to function as a monitor, had two 14-inch guns in 2 single turrets, while the other design had four 8-inch guns in two twin turrets.

See also
 List of cruisers of the United States Navy

References

External links

 http://www.avalanchepress.com/OmahaAlternatives.php
 http://www.avalanchepress.com/AmericanCruisers.php

Cruiser classes